TMSS may refer to:

Thengamara Mohila Sabuj Sangha, an NGO from Bangladesh
Two-Micron Sky Survey, an infrared astronomical survey and catalog
Taiwanese Modern Spelling System, the basis for the Modern Literal Taiwanese orthography
Trademark Security System, a copyright protection mechanism used by Sega that was subject of the 1992 Sega v. Accolade court case